World of Warriors is an action role-playing video game developed and published by Mind Candy for iOS and Android. It was released in November 2014. A PlayStation 4 port published by Sony Interactive Entertainment was released on March 21, 2018. It was later deactivated and is no longer available on iOS or Android, though the PlayStation 4 version wasn’t affected.

Gameplay 
Gamezebo places World of Warriors in the collect and battle game genre, while Gematsu calls it a combat-focused adventure game. IGN Italia places it in the action genre.

The player creates a team of characters which the player uses to battle enemy non-player characters, in groups of one to three. Defeating enemies rewards the player with experience, in-game money and material to create other items. After some experience, the characters level up, and the player can assign items to each character which makes it more powerful. Similar to the game of rock, paper, scissors, certain characters are weak to specific other characters, while strong against others. Each character has a unique move. The player can participate in combat by timing his actions to the actions of his characters, which make his characters' attacks stronger. Each battle takes place in a specific arena, each with its own environment.

The game provides players a method to increase the level of their characters outside the main story mode.

Each of the characters is based on historical fighters.

Gamezebo at release reported there would be player versus player.

The game is free to play with some microtransactions.

Development and release 
The developer Mind Candy conceived of the game at a retreat. Art director Johnny Taylor was inspired by his son, who had an appreciation for warriors in history. The game was developed at the Brighton studio.

The game is intended to be a family game, rather than a kid's game; Mind Candy founder Michael Smith described the game as having "depth and complexity". He was worried about the competition on the mobile video game platforms during development. Smith noted that "developers have to be responsible", since designing for kids, taking into account the desire to make money in a microtransaction economy, can be difficult.

The developer announced the game for both iOS and Android in May 2014, with the expectation of release later in 2014. The Telegraph assumed the developer would be "hopeful" for its release, as The Telegraph expected the company to have an initial public offering within a few years of release.

Reception 
Gamezebo praised the unique artwork and the inclusion of the historical aspects, as well as the reflex-based gameplay during battles. IGN Italia praised the large number of heroes for selection and assigned the game a score of 8 of 10.

Gamezebo criticized the number of currencies (three) and multiple energy systems (two). IGN Italia said that the game was not optimized for the newest phones.

References 

2014 video games
Android (operating system) games
IOS games
Multiplayer and single-player video games
PlayStation 4 games
Role-playing video games
Video games developed in the United Kingdom